Ossingen is a municipality in the district of Andelfingen in the canton of Zürich in Switzerland.

History
Ossingen is first mentioned in 1230 as de Ozzingin.

Geography

Of this area, 57.9% is used for agricultural purposes, 30% is forested, 7.9% is settled (buildings or roads) and the remainder (4.2%) is non-productive (rivers, glaciers or mountains).

The municipality includes the village of Ossingen, the hamlets of Weiler Burghof, Gisenhard, Hausen and Langenmoos, the farming settlements of Werdhof, Ziegelhütte and Dachsenhausen as well as Schloss Wyden (Widen Castle).  It also includes the Husemersee a lake located in the municipality.

Demographics
, 7.0% of the population was made up of foreign nationals. Over the last 10 years the population has grown at a rate of 9.9%. Most of the population speaks German  (94.7%), with Albanian being second most common ( 1.5%) and Italian being third ( 0.5%).

In the 2007 election the most popular party was the SVP which received 48.8% of the vote.  The next three most popular parties were the SPS (13.8%), the Green Party (10.7%) and the FDP (10.6%).

The age distribution of the population is children and teenagers (0–19 years old) make up 28.6% of the population, while adults (20–64 years old) make up 57.4% and seniors (over 64 years old) make up 14%.  In Ossingen about 79% of the population (between age 25-64) have completed either non-mandatory upper secondary education or additional higher education (either university or a Fachhochschule).

Ossingen has an unemployment rate of 1.22%.  , there were 105 people employed in the primary economic sector and about 35 businesses are involved in this sector; 79 people are employed in the secondary sector and there are 18 businesses in this sector; 193 people are employed in the tertiary sector, with 38 businesses in this sector.
The historical population is given in the following table:

Transport 
Ossingen railway station is  served by Zurich S-Bahn line S29, which links Winterthur and Stein am Rhein.

See also
 Schloss Wyden

References

External links 

 Official website 
 

Municipalities of the canton of Zürich